Andrea Celeste Saulo (born 6 May 1964) is an Argentine meteorologist and educator. She has served as director of the Servicio Meteorológico Nacional (SMN) since 8 July 2014, and first vice president of the World Meteorological Organization (WMO) since 24 April 2018. She is the first woman to hold the latter office.

Biography
Celeste Saulo was born in Buenos Aires on 6 May 1964. She earned a licentiate in meteorological sciences at the University of Buenos Aires (UBA), and a doctorate in atmospheric sciences there in 1996.

She has been a researcher at UBA since 2000, and is a profesora asociada at its Faculty of Exact and Natural Sciences. She has been an SMN researcher since 2016. Her specialties are atmospheric modeling, the representation of uncertainty in forecasts, and the generation of products oriented to decision making.

She was the director of undergraduate and doctoral theses, director of doctoral and post-doctoral scholarships, and a doctoral thesis juror at UBA. She was elected to two consecutive terms as director of the Department of Atmospheric and Ocean Sciences.

She has been a member of the World Meteorological Research Program's scientific steering committee since 2011, and joined WMO's Executive Council in 2015.

In July 2014, she was appointed director of SMN. In April 2018, the WMO appointed her second vice president, and interim first vice president to fill the vacancy left by Rob Varley. She was elected first vice president the following year.

Selected publications
 2000: Assessment of a regional climate for South America: a dynamical downscaling approach
 2017: Joint Assessment of Soil Moisture Indicators (JASMIN) for southeastern South America

References

External links
 Celeste Saulo at the World Meteorological Organization

1964 births
21st-century Argentine scientists
21st-century Argentine women scientists
Argentine meteorologists
Living people
University of Buenos Aires alumni
Academic staff of the University of Buenos Aires
Women meteorologists
World Meteorological Organization people